Carlos Castelo Branco (May 1898 – 24 September 1972) was a Brazilian rower. He competed in the men's double sculls event at the 1924 Summer Olympics. He also competed in the water polo tournament at the 1932 Summer Olympics.

References

External links
 

1898 births
1972 deaths
Brazilian male rowers
Brazilian male water polo players
Olympic rowers of Brazil
Olympic water polo players of Brazil
Rowers at the 1924 Summer Olympics
Water polo players at the 1932 Summer Olympics
Sportspeople from Rio de Janeiro (city)
20th-century Brazilian people